Valentina Lalenkova (born 5 May 1957) is a Ukrainian speed skater. She competed at the 1980 Winter Olympics and the 1984 Winter Olympics, representing the Soviet Union.

References

External links
 

1957 births
Living people
Soviet female speed skaters
Ukrainian female speed skaters
Olympic speed skaters of the Soviet Union
Speed skaters at the 1980 Winter Olympics
Speed skaters at the 1984 Winter Olympics
World Allround Speed Skating Championships medalists
World Sprint Speed Skating Championships medalists
Sportspeople from Yekaterinburg